Prestin Ryan (born June 29, 1980) is a Canadian former professional ice hockey defenceman who played one game for the Vancouver Canucks of the National Hockey League (NHL).

Playing career

Amateur
Born in Arcola, Saskatchewan, Prestin Ryan played for the Yorkton Mallers in the SMAAAHL.  He spent three seasons with the Estevan Bruins of the SJHL.  While playing in the SJHL, he was recruited to play hockey at the University of Maine.  Ryan spent four seasons playing for the Black Bears in the Hockey East conference.  He picked up several NCAA and conference honours while there.  After playing his senior season, Ryan turned pro for the 2004–05 season.

Professional
He started his professional career with the Syracuse Crunch of the AHL.  He was initially signed by the Columbus Blue Jackets.  In the 2005–06 season, Ryan made his NHL debut, playing in one game, for the Vancouver Canucks.  After his second season within the Canucks organization he joined the Chicago Blackhawks and played the 2007–08 season in the AHL with affiliate, the Rockford IceHogs.

A free agent, on November 21, 2008 he signed a contract with Adler Mannheim of the DEL. Ryan left after just six months on May 3, 2009 and signed with League rival ERC Ingolstadt. In the 2009–10 season, Ryan produced his highest totals in the DEL with 7 goals and 27 points in 47 games. On August 26, 2010, the Canadian was on the move again and  signed with the Iserlohn Roosters, where he replaced the tryout player David Walker.

After one season away, on April 4, 2011, Ryan returned to sign a one-year contract with Ingolstadt.

Career statistics

Awards and honours

1998 - SJHL All Rookie Team
2004 - Hockey East Best Defensive Defenseman (co-winner w/ Andrew Alberts)

See also
List of players who played only one game in the NHL

References

External links
 

1980 births
Adler Mannheim players
Canadian ice hockey defencemen
ERC Ingolstadt players
Estevan Bruins (SJHL) players
Ice hockey people from Saskatchewan
Iserlohn Roosters players
Living people
Maine Black Bears men's ice hockey players
Manitoba Moose players
Mora IK players
Rockford IceHogs (AHL) players
Syracuse Crunch players
Undrafted National Hockey League players
Vancouver Canucks players
Canadian expatriate ice hockey players in Germany
Canadian expatriate ice hockey players in Sweden
People from Arcola, Saskatchewan
AHCA Division I men's ice hockey All-Americans